Léon Matthieu Cochereau (1793, Montigny-le-Gannelon - 30 August 1817) was a French painter. A student of David, he painted his master's studio in a painting now held at the Louvre . Another of his works is held at the Musée Antoine Vivenel. He died at sea of dysentery whilst going to Greece accompanied by his uncle Pierre Prévost, the panorama painter - the precise site of death was, according to the sources, "across from Bizerte, in sight of Athens, near the Isle of Cerigo, in the Ionian Sea.

References 
 Procès verbaux de la Société archéologique d’Eure-et-Loir, Tome V, Chartres, 1876 (1873–1875), séance du 9 janvier 1873.
 Hommes illustres de l'Orléanais
 Jean Prévost, Notice historique sur Montigny-le-Gannelon, Châteaudun, 1852.
 Camille Marcille, Notice sur Matthieu Cochereau, peintre beauceron, Chartres, 1875.
 Louis du Chalard & Antoine Gautier, "Les panoramas orientaux du peintre Pierre Prévost (1764-1823)", in Orients, Bulletin de l'association des anciens élèves et amis des langues orientales, June 2010, p. 90-93.

1793 births
People from Eure-et-Loir
1817 deaths
19th-century French painters
French male painters
Pupils of Jacques-Louis David
Deaths from dysentery
People who died at sea
18th-century French male artists